Frank McGuirt was a Democratic member of the North Carolina House of Representatives and a former sheriff of Union County, North Carolina.

McGuirt was appointed to the legislature in March 2011 to replace Rep. Pryor Gibson, who had resigned. He represents House District 69, which includes all of Anson County and part of Union County.  His term ended January 1, 2013.

McGuirt served as sheriff of Union County from 1979 to 2002 when he retired.  He then opened McGuirt Advertising a promotional products dealership.  He was also a licensed private investigator, associated with Allen's Professional Investigations.  Prior to becoming sheriff he was a deputy sheriff under Sheriff Shelly Griffin and Frank Fowler, rising to rank of lieutenant.  McGuirt was a crime scene investigator and fingerprint technician.  Prior to the sheriff's office he was a Monroe City Firefighter for 3 years.  McGuirt also operated a retail store specializing in phonograph records and photography.  He also was a partner in a commercial printing company in Monroe for several years.

Frank McGuirt and his wife the former Jenny Ratliff of Anson County are the parents of two sons, William of Hunterville, NC and Jonathan of Monroe, NC.  Jonathan and his former wife, Christina, are the parents of Frank's granddaughter, Elizabeth.

While sheriff Frank McGuirt served as president of the NC Sheriffs' Association and was named Union County Man of the Year.

External links
Official site

References
WRAL: Ex-sheriff McGuirt replaces Gibson in NC House

Democratic Party members of the North Carolina House of Representatives
Living people
21st-century American politicians
Year of birth missing (living people)